Günter Ruch (born 19 August 1956 in Sinzig, Rhineland-Palatinate, died 18 December 2010 in Bad Neuenahr-Ahrweiler) was a German writer, journalist, politician of the FDP and author of contemporary, fantasy and historical novels. He lived in Bad Neuenahr-Ahrweiler, where, on 18 December 2010, he died of cancer.

Works 
 1996: Die Farbe der Nacht. Nitzsche (Fantasy)
 2002: Genovefa. Rhein-Mosel-Verlag (historical novel)
 2005: Burg Hammerstein. Club Bertelsmann (historical novel)
 2006: Die Herrin von Burg Hammerstein. Droemer Knaur (historical novel)
 2006: Genovefa. Audiobook, Verlag TechniSat Digital
 2007: Gottes Fälscher. Club Bertelsmann (historical novel)
 2008: Der Krüppelmacher. Verlag Philipp von Zabern (historical novel)
 2009: Gottes Fälscher. Droemer Knaur (historical novel)
 2010: Die Blutkönigin. Verlag Philipp von Zabern (historical novel)

1956 births
20th-century German writers
2010 deaths
People from Sinzig
FDP.The Liberals politicians
20th-century German male writers